HaShalom Stadium also known as Al-Salam Stadium is a stadium with a capacity of 7,000. Located in Umm al-Fahm, Israel. It is the home stadium of Hapoel Umm al-Fahm and Maccabi Umm al-Fahm.

References

Football venues in Israel
Sport in Umm al-Fahm
Sports venues in Haifa District